Henry Homer, the elder (1719 – 24 July 1791) was an English clergyman, known as a writer on topics related to economic development.

Life
The son of Edward Homer of Sutton Coldfield, Warwickshire, was educated at Oxford, where he matriculated on 26 June 1736 as a member of University College. He became a demy of Magdalen College in 1737, and graduated B.A. in 1740, M.A. in 1743.

Homer was appointed rector of Birdingbury, Warwickshire, and vicar of Willoughby in 1764; and chaplain to Edward Leigh, 5th Baron Leigh. From 1774 to 1779 he also held the vicarage of Ansty. He died on 24 July 1791, and was buried at Birdingbury.

Works
Homer published:

 An Essay on the Nature and Method of ascertaining the specific Shares of Proprietors upon the Inclosure of Common Fields; with Observations on the Inconveniences of Open Fields, and upon the objections to this Inclosure, particularly as far as they relate to the Public and the Poor, Oxford, 1766.

Homer was a commissioner for enclosures, and drew up instructions for the surveyors carrying out the practical work involved. He is considered a significant author on agrarian improvement. Himself a supporter of enclosure, he identified four common objections:

depopulation;
reduction in corn harvests;
loss of rights in cutting turf and furze (turbary);
loss of amenity, for travel and sport.

Homer's Essay was published early in the major controversy over enclosures, of 1760 to 1790. During it, he had a local opponent in Stephen Addington.

 An Enquiry into the means of Preserving and Improving the Publick Roads of this Kingdom. With Observations on the probable consequences of the present plan, Oxford, 1767. He wrote of a recent "revolution" in transportation.

Family
Homer had 17 children, including Arthur Homer, Henry the younger, and Philip Bracebridge Homer.

Notes

Attribution

1719 births
1791 deaths
18th-century English Anglican priests
English economics writers
People from Sutton Coldfield
English male non-fiction writers